James Berry, died 9 May 1691, was a Clerk from the West Midlands who served with the Parliamentarian army in the Wars of the Three Kingdoms. Characterised by a contemporary and friend as "one of Cromwell's favourites",  during the 1655 to 1657 Rule of the Major-Generals, he was administrator for Herefordshire, Worcestershire, Shropshire and Wales.

In this role, Berry's sympathetic treatment of Fifth Monarchists and Quakers, two religious sects many viewed as anarchic revolutionaries, meant he was seen as unreliable by George Monck, architect of the 1660 Stuart Restoration. Arrested in early 1660, he was held in Scarborough Castle until 1672; after his release, he became a Market gardener in Stoke Newington, where he died in 1691.

Personal details

Almost nothing is known of Berry's early life, other than by the 1630s he was employed as a clerk at an Ironworks in the West Midlands. He shared a house in Stourbridge with Richard Baxter (1615–1691), a Presbyterian minister whom he helped win an appointment as schoolmaster in Dudley, and attended his ordination in 1638.

At some point before 1650, he married Mary Berry, who died in 1681; whether they had children is unknown.

First English Civil War

When the First English Civil War began in August 1642, Berry became Captain lieutenant in the cavalry regiment commanded by Oliver Cromwell. Later known as the "Ironsides", in 1643 this unit became part of the Army of the Eastern Association, led by the Earl of Manchester. Along with Berry, several officers from the regiment went on to hold senior positions under the Commonwealth, including William Packer, John Desborough and Edward Whalley.

Berry's first major action was at Gainsborough in July 1643, when he was credited with killing the Royalist commander, Charles Cavendish. During this period, he seems to have become a religious Independent. His friend Baxter, who was viewed as a moderate Presbyterian, reportedly refused an invitation to serve the Ironsides as chaplain, allegedly due to his dislike of their religious radicalism. He later described Berry as being "one of Cromwell's favourites".

Berry served continuously with Cromwell over the next eighteen months, fighting at Winceby, Lincoln, Marston Moor, and Second Newbury. After the New Model Army was formed in April 1645, Berry and his troop became part of Sir Thomas Fairfax' regiment, which was present at Naseby, Langport, and the storming of Bristol in September 1645. Now a major, in February 1646 Berry took part in the Battle of Torrington, the last major action of the war in the West Country. He and his regiment then joined the Siege of Oxford, just before Charles I surrendered to the Scots Covenanter army in May 1646. The king ordered all remaining Royalist forces to lay down their arms, and Oxford capitulated in June.

Second English Civil War
However, victory resulted in bitter disputes over the post-war political settlement between the New Model Army, led by Fairfax and Cromwell, and the majority of MPs in Parliament. These divisions also impacted the army, and in August 1647 Berry was transferred into a regiment commanded by Colonel Philip Twisleton. The latter had replaced Edward Rossiter, whom the Army Council viewed as politically unreliable.

In April 1648, the Scots joined with English Royalists and disillusioned Parliamentarians to restore Charles I, leading to the Second English Civil War. Berry served with the forces sent north to deal with an invading army of Scots supported by their English allies, and fought at the Battle of Preston in August, a victory which ended serious Royalist resistance. He was chosen to bring news of Preston to Parliament, but shortly afterwards was posted to Scotland, which the New Model occupied for several months before withdrawing. This meant Berry was absent from the proceedings that ended with the Execution of Charles I in January 1649, and establishment of the Commonwealth of England.

The Commonwealth 1649 to 1660

In October 1659, the reinstated Rump Parliament revoked the commissions of Berry and other officers who signed

Footnotes

References

Sources
 
 
  
 
 
 

1691 deaths
Year of birth unknown
Members of the Parliament of England for Worcestershire
English MPs 1656–1658
Parliamentarian military personnel of the English Civil War
English generals
Fifth Monarchists
Members of Cromwell's Other House